

The Savoia-Marchetti S.71 was an Italian eight-passenger light transport designed and built by Savoia-Marchetti. The S.71 was a three-engine, high-wing cantilever monoplane with a fixed tailwheel landing gear. It had a crew of four and room for eight passengers. The first four aircraft were powered by three 190 kW (260 hp) Walter Castor II radial engines, but the last three had 276 kW (370 hp) Piaggio P.VII engines.

Specifications (Castor-powered)

References

 

S.71
1930s Italian airliners
Trimotors
High-wing aircraft
Aircraft first flown in 1930